California is the seventh album by The Electric Prunes, released in 2004 and featuring founding members  James Lowe, Ken Williams, and Mark Tulin.

The tracks on the album revolve around the Summer of Love in California and life after it.

Track listing
All tracks composed by James Lowe and Mark Tulin.
 "Sideshow Charade" – 3:39
 "49 Songs" – 3:44 
 "I Never Knew What You Wanted" – 3:36
 "Makin' Some Noise" – 3:07
 "Pacific Ocean Blue" – 4:56
 "I'll Drag You Home" – 2:40
 "Rosy Made Me Crazy" – 3:52
 "Transient Absolution" – 3:55
 "Tidal Wave" – 4:47
 "Rewired" – 3:49
 "Running with Scissors" – 4:32
 "The Rickenbacker 12 String" – 6:40
 "Cinema Verite" – 7:22

Personnel

The Electric Prunes
 James Lowe – vocals, guitar, harmonica
 Mark Tulin – bass 
 Ken Williams – lead guitar
 Joe Dooley – drums
 Mark Moulin – rhythm guitar

Additional musicians
 Peter Lewis – 12 string guitar (tracks 12-13),  acoustic guitar (track 1),  baritone guitar (track 9),  background vocals (tracks 1-3, 5, 7, 10, 12-13)
 Bandshee Meeks – background vocals (tracks 1, 13)
 Frank Palmer – fretless bass (track 13)
 Jim Tamborello – saxophone, horns (tracks 9, 13)
 Ian van der Molen – drums (tracks 1-3, 6-7, 12)

Technical
 James Lowe – producer, engineer
 Mark Tulin – producer
 Tony Ripartetti – mastering
 Randy Luczak – design
 Rudi "Fuzztone" Protrudi – cover art
 Pamela Lowe – photography

References

External links
 aural-innovations revue.
 Classicrock revue.

The Electric Prunes albums
2004 albums